Joshua Kutryk (born March 21, 1982) is a Canadian astronaut, engineer, and pilot. He was selected by the Canadian Space Agency (CSA) one of the two members of the 2017 CSA Group alongside Jenni Sidey.

Early life and education
Joshua Kutryk was born on March 21, 1982, in Fort Saskatchewan, Alberta. His family emigrated to Canada from Ukraine in 1910.

He graduated from the Royal Military College of Canada in 2004 with a bachelor's degree in mechanical engineering. 

He subsequently completed a master's degree in space studies at Embry-Riddle Aeronautical University in 2009, a master's degree in flight test engineering at the Air University in 2012, and a master's degree in defence studies at the Royal Military College of Canada in 2014.

Career
Prior to joining the Canadian Space Agency (CSA), Kutryk was an experimental test pilot and a fighter pilot in the Canadian Armed Forces (CAF) in Cold Lake, Alberta, where he was the head of the unit in charge of flight-testing fighter aircraft. He earned the rank of lieutenant-colonel. Kutryk was most notably responsible for the testing of new aircraft technologies on the CF-18 plane. Kutryk had served in Libya and Afghanistan during his time in CAF.

In 2012, he received the Liethen-Title Award for the top test pilot graduate from the U.S. Air Force Test Pilot School. This award was also conferred to his fellow astronaut Chris Hadfield in 1988.

CSA selection and astronaut career
Kutryk was selected by the Canadian Space Agency to undergo training as an astronaut as part of the 2017 CSA Group, the fourth Canadian astronaut recruitment campaign. Kutryk and Dr. Jenni Sidey were selected among a large field of qualified candidates.

Kutryk had previously applied to become an astronaut in the 2009 CSA selection, where astronauts David Saint-Jacques and Jeremy Hansen were selected. Kutryk was shortlisted to undergo a yearlong testing program and ultimately found himself in the top 16 finalists of some 5,350 candidates. His perseverance in successfully applying again in 2017 is highlighted on the CSA website.

As of July 2017, Kutryk has relocated to Houston, Texas, to start the two-year NASA Astronaut Candidate Training Program at the Johnson Space Center. He is a member of the 2017 NASA astronaut class.yaa

In September 2019 Kutryk participated, as a Cavenauts, in the training ESA CAVES organized by the European Space Agency between Italy and Slovenia.

References

External links
 CSA profile
 Biography on spacefacts.de
 CSA Biography on YouTube
 Instagram Profile
 Twitter Profile
 CSA Video Gallery
 CSA Photo Gallery

1982 births
Air University (United States Air Force) alumni
Canadian astronauts
Embry–Riddle Aeronautical University alumni
Living people
Canadian people of Ukrainian descent
People from Fort Saskatchewan
Royal Military College of Canada alumni
Scientists from Alberta
U.S. Air Force Test Pilot School alumni